Pascal Bubiriza (November 20, 1932 – April 30, 1972) was a Burundian Hutu diplomat, minister of interior and minister of communication.

Career 
From 1954 to 1961, he was employed in judiciary and local administration.
From 20 October 1961 to 1 July 1962, he was chef de Cabinet in the government of André Muhirwa
In 1962, he was designated Burundian Ambassador to the United States and was the first Permanent Representative to the Headquarters of the United Nations.
From June 1963 to March 1964, he was Minister of Interior, Security, Immigration and State Administration.
From April 1964 to May 1965, he was ambassador in the Foreign Ministry.
From May 1965 to 1967, he was ambassador in Addis Ababa Ethiopia and was accredited as representative to the Organisation of African Unity and as ambassador to the government in Khartoum (Sudan)
From 1967 to 1969, he was ambassador in Moscow.
In 1969, he was designated Minister of Communication.

References

1932 births
1972 deaths
People who died in the Ikiza
Ambassadors of Burundi to the United States
Ambassadors of Burundi to Ethiopia
Ambassadors of Burundi to Russia
Interior ministers of Burundi
Communications ministers of Burundi
Hutu people
People from Bubanza Province